Plumbago pulchella is a species of flowering plant on the Plumbaginaceae family. It is referred to by the common name cola de iguana.

The plant species is endemic to more than 20 states in Mexico.

Medicinal uses
Pulchellidin, an O-methylated anthocyanidin, can be found in Plumbago pulchella.

It is a traditional medicinal plant in Mesoamerica, including of the Rarámuri people in northwestern Mexico.

In Michoacán it is used as a veterinary medicine.

References

External links

pulchella
Endemic flora of Mexico
Flora of Mexico
Flora of Veracruz
Medicinal plants of North America
Plants used in traditional Native American medicine
Plants described in 1848
Taxa named by Pierre Edmond Boissier